Ade Rai (born I Gusti Agung Kusuma Yudha Rai; 6 May 1970) is an Indonesian professional natural bodybuilder and he also competed in amateur body building championships like SEA Games and Asian Games. He is a three time world natural body building champion, and a huge celebrity and a successful business man in Indonesia (he owns "Rai Fitness" fitness/bodybuilding gym chains throughout the country, including a restaurant). He is also the co-founder of "Rai Institute" and widely considered to be "The Father" of Indonesian  bodybuilding.

External links 
  Profil Ade Rai on Intisari
  Ade Rai's Official Website
  News about Ade Rai on Kompas
  Ade Rai's photos on di Kapanlagi.com
  Ade Rai Yahoo Groups 
 Website: Ade Rai

1970 births
Living people
Professional bodybuilders
People from Jakarta
Indonesian Hindus